Casino Jack and the United States of Money is a 2010 documentary film directed by Alex Gibney.

Synopsis

The film focuses on the career of Washington, D.C. lobbyist, businessman, and con man Jack Abramoff, who was involved in a massive corruption scandal that led to the conviction of himself, two Bush White House officials, Rep. Bob Ney, and nine other lobbyists and congressional staffers. Abramoff was convicted of fraud, conspiracy, and tax evasion in 2006 and of trading expensive gifts, meals and sports trips in exchange for political favors. As of December 2010 Abramoff has completed his prison sentence.

Contributors
Juan Babauta – Governor, CNMI (2002–2006)
Jim Benedetto – Federal Labor Ombudsman, CNMI (2002-2008)
Pamela Brown – Former Attorney General, CNMI
Tom DeLay – U.S. Congressman (R-TX) (1984–2006)
Nina Easton – Author, Gang of Five
Peter Fitzgerald – U.S. Senator (R-IL) (1999–2005)
Thomas Frank – Author, The Wrecking Crew
David Grosh – Former Rehoboth Beach lifeguard
Carlos Hisa – Lt. Governor, Tigua Tribe of El Paso, Texas
Robert G. Kaiser – Author, So Damn Much Money
Adam Kidan – Former owner, SunCruz Casinos
Shawn Martin – Reporter, American Press of Lake Charles, Louisiana
Rep. George Miller (D-CA)
Bob Ney – U.S. Congressman, (R-OH) (1995–2006)
Ron Platt – Former Greenberg Traurig lobbyist
Tom Rodgers – Lobbyist, Carlyle Consulting
Rep. Dana Rohrabacher (R-CA)
Khaled Saffuri – Public affairs consultant, Meridian Strategies
Susan Schmidt – Former reporter, The Washington Post
David Sickey – Vice Chairman, Coushatta Tribe of Louisiana
Melanie Sloan – Citizens for Responsibility and Ethics in Washington (CREW)
Peter Stone – Author, Heist: Superlobbyist Jack Abramoff
Froilan Tenorio – Governor, CNMI (1994–1998)
Neil Volz – Former Chief of Staff to Rep. Bob Ney (R-OH)
J. Michael Waller – Director, Institute of World Politics

Reception
On review aggregator website Rotten Tomatoes, the film holds an approval rating of 83% based on 65 reviews, and an average rating of 7.1/10. The website's critical consensus reads, "Casino Jacks subject matter is enraging, but in the hands of director Alex Gibney, it's also well-presented and briskly entertaining."

References

External links
Official website
 
C-SPAN Q&A interview with Alex Gibney about Casino Jack and the United States of Money, June 13, 2010

2010 films
American documentary films
2010 documentary films
Films directed by Alex Gibney
Documentary films about American politics
Documentary films about crime in the United States
Lobbying in the United States
Participant (company) films
2010s English-language films
2010s American films